Addison Township may refer to the following places in the United States:

 Addison Township, DuPage County, Illinois
 Addison Township, Shelby County, Indiana
 Addison Township, Michigan
 Addison Township, Knox County, Nebraska
 Addison Township, North Dakota
 Addison Township, Gallia County, Ohio
 Addison Township, Pennsylvania

Township name disambiguation pages